Corby Glen railway station was a station on the Great Northern Railway main line serving Corby Glen, Lincolnshire. It was west of the village on the Melton Mowbray road, and was originally named just Corby, but was renamed to avoid confusion with Corby station on the Midland Railway in Northamptonshire. The station closed in 1959.

References

Disused railway stations in Lincolnshire
Former Great Northern Railway stations
Railway stations in Great Britain opened in 1853
Railway stations in Great Britain closed in 1959
1852 establishments in England